Donny Parenteau (born in Prince Albert, Saskatchewan) is singer-songwriter, multi-instrumentalist, and record producer.  He is best for known his solo career and his work as fiddle player, guitarist, and mandolin player for country music singer Neal McCoy.  In February 2011, Parenteau signed with the record label 306 Records/EMI Music Canada to help distribute his albums.

Early life
At 14, Parenteau took up the fiddle.  After mastering the fiddle, he picked up other instruments like the guitar (both acoustic and electric) and the mandolin (both acoustic and electric).  Parenteau cites some of his influences as Bryan Sklar, Freddie Pelltier, and George Pistun

Career
After picking up the violin at a young age, by 19 he was playing professionally. In 1991, Parenteau was playing in Edmonton, Alberta and was invited to a show by Neal McCoy who was also playing in Edmonton. Upon talking with McCoy, Parenteau discovered they had similar taste in music. McCoy was looking for a fiddle player, but didn't have the money to hire one.  Parenteau wanted the chance to audition and would not let up until he got the chance to audition.  Parenteau listened to the group jamming and had a grasp of what they were playing.  It was that song he would use as the audition piece. During his time touring with McCoy, Parenteau got to open for such artists as Merle Haggard, Tim McGraw, Faith Hill, Buck Owens, George Jones, Charlie Pride, Loretta Lynn, Charlie Daniels, Hank Williams, Jr., Reba McEntire, Garth Brooks, and Shania Twain. Parenteau also graced the Grand Ole Opry stage. Parenteau was the only member of the live band that was also on the recordings. After performing with Neal McCoy for 12 years and playing 250–300 shows a year, Parenteau returned to Prince Albert to embark on a solo career.

Charity work
Parenteau has done a number of humanitarian and charity work.  In 2001 SCMA International Humanitarian Award for his efforts.  He also appears on Telemiracle starting on the 32nd edition of the telethon.  Parenteau co-wrote the current Telemiracle opening theme song with Brad Johner entitled "You are the Miracle".  It became the theme in 2011.  He also embarks on a tour of elementary schools in Saskatchewan each year as a motivational speaker in which he spreads his message of anti-bullying.

Discography

Studio albums

Collaborations

Singles

Music videos

Awards and nominations

Parenteau has been nominated for a multitude of awards all across Canada picking up a number of them along the way.  In 2008, Parenteau was nominated for his country's highest honour by being nominated for a Juno Award.

References

External links
Official website

Living people
Canadian country guitarists
Canadian male guitarists
Métis musicians
People from Prince Albert, Saskatchewan
306 Records artists
Canadian country fiddlers
Canadian male violinists and fiddlers
Canadian country singer-songwriters
Fransaskois people
Canadian mandolinists
Musicians from Saskatchewan
20th-century Canadian male singers
20th-century Canadian violinists and fiddlers
21st-century Canadian violinists and fiddlers
20th-century Canadian guitarists
21st-century Canadian guitarists
Canadian male singer-songwriters
20th-century Canadian multi-instrumentalists
21st-century Canadian multi-instrumentalists
21st-century Canadian male singers
Year of birth missing (living people)